The Caudron C.860 was a single engine, single seat monoplane ordered by the French government as a long distance communications aircraft.  First flown in 1938, it was also expected to set speed and altitude records but the outbreak of World War II ended developments.

Design

The C.860 was ordered by the French Air Ministry who planned to use it, piloted by André Japy, for rapid long distance communications. It was also expected to set distance and altitude records in Category 1 with a  Renault engine and in Category 2 with a  Renault, but war intervened.

Its wing and empennage were aerodynamically similar to those of the Caudron Simoun, though the single-piece wing was structurally closer to that of the record-setting Rafale racer. The wing was tetragonal in  plan, with more sweep on the trailing edge than on the leading edge, though the tips were semi-elliptical.  It had an all-wood structure with a single box spar which incorporated an upper flange of gumbo-limbo, a Central and South American wood of particularly high bulk modulus, together with spruce and plywood ribs. The ply skin was finished with a fabric overlay.  Its ailerons were carried on auxiliary spars.

The C.860's fuselage was slender, with a maximum width of only  and about one third of it ahead of the wing leading edge. The pilot had an enclosed cockpit with his head raised only slightly above the fuselage under a shallow canopy with a horizontal strip of plexiglas for forwards and sideways vision, a solid top and an extended fairing aft. There were also windows in the fuselage sides for downward views.

The fuselage had a wooden frame with canvas covered sides and curved magnesium sheet top and bottom. The empennage of the C.860 was conventional, with a straight-tapered, blunt-tipped horizontal tail carrying separate elevators.  The tall vertical tail had a similar shape though, unlike the elevators, the rudder was balanced.  The aircraft had a fixed, tailwheel undercarriage with a  track. Messier oleo strut landing legs were mounted on the wing spar.  Legs, mainwheels and the steerable tailwheel, also on an oleo strut, were enclosed in fairings.

Development

By 5 September 1938 the C.860 had been brought, still not quite complete, from the Caudron factory at Issy-les-Moulineaux to the airfield at Guyancourt. The first flight had been made, piloted by Delmotte, by 10 September. Its initial tests had been completed by the end of September, when the C.860 entered the Centre d'Essais de Matériels Aériens (CEMA), the French official testing centre at Villacoublay. These tests temporarily finished at the beginning of January 1939 but the C.860 returned to CEMA at the end of the month.

With certification complete, the Air Ministry took the C.860 to Istres to determine the take-off run required with the heavy fuel load needed to achieve the desired long range.

Specifications

References

1930s French civil aircraft
C.
Aircraft first flown in 1938